The Black Hills Posse was a professional basketball team based in Rapid City, South Dakota that competed in the International Basketball Association beginning in the 1995–96 season. The team was founded by George Daniel, an attorney from Pennsylvania.  The Posse were created for Rapid City as a response to the departure of the Rapid City Thrillers of the Continental Basketball Association. They were the 1996–97 International Basketball Association champions with an all-time winning record of 85 and 37.  

In 1998, the Black Hills Posse were sold to John Tuschman (former owner of the original Rapid City Thrillers of the Continental Basketball Association). Tuschman tried to spark the old spirit the Thrillers had from the late 1980s and early 1990s, by renaming the Posse to the Thrillers and bringing back the original "flaming basketball" logo. Unfortunately, Tuschman was unsuccessful and the new Thrillers folded after the end of the 1998-99 season. The IBA continued for one more season in Rapid City, as the Black Hills Gold played in the 1999-00 season for one year. Rapid City has been without professional basketball ever since.

Year-by-year

Some notable players
Isaac Burton
Dennis Edwards (basketball)
Damon Jones
G.J. Hunter
Lonnie Cooper

External links
Black Hills Posse website archived on February 20, 1999 via the Wayback Machine

Defunct basketball teams in the United States
Basketball teams in South Dakota
Sports in Rapid City, South Dakota